The 4 arrondissements of the Lot-et-Garonne department are:
 Arrondissement of Agen, (prefecture of the Lot-et-Garonne department: Agen) with 71 communes.  The population of the arrondissement was 120,499 in 2016.  
 Arrondissement of Marmande, (subprefecture: Marmande) with 98 communes.  The population of the arrondissement was 83,647 in 2016.  
 Arrondissement of Nérac, (subprefecture: Nérac) with 58 communes.  The population of the arrondissement was 39,020 in 2016.
 Arrondissement of Villeneuve-sur-Lot, (subprefecture: Villeneuve-sur-Lot) with 92 communes.  The population of the arrondissement was 89,667 in 2016.

History

In 1800 the arrondissements of Agen, Marmande, Nérac and Villeneuve-sur-Lot were established. The arrondissement of Nérac was abolished in 1926, and recreated in 1942.

References

Lot-et-Garonne